The 2021 LA Giltinis season was the inaugural season in the clubs history since their entry to the Major League Rugby in 2020. Darren Coleman was the first coach of the club. Dave Dennis was the club's first ever captain. The team finished the season first in the Western Conference standings and qualified for the 2021 Major League Rugby playoffs. The Giltinis won the Final against Rugby ATL. This was the second team to win the final in its first season, after Seattle Seawolves achieved it back in 2018.

The LA Giltinis played their home matchups at Los Angeles Memorial Coliseum in Los Angeles, California. Due to a scheduling conflict at the stadium, SoFi Stadium was used for a matchup against Utah Warriors.

Schedule

Post season

Standings

References

LA Giltinis seasons
LA
2021 in sports in California